The 1975 Indiana Hoosiers football team represented Indiana University in the 1975 Big Ten Conference football season. They participated as members of the Big Ten Conference. The Hoosiers played their home games at Memorial Stadium in Bloomington, Indiana. The team was coached by Lee Corso, in his third year as head coach of the Hoosiers. 
The Hoosiers offense only scored 104 points while the defense allowed 254 points. Indiana Hoosiers men's basketball player and College Basketball Hall of Fame member Quinn Buckner was drafted by the Washington Redskins though he did not play football his junior or senior year.

Schedule

1976 NFL draftees

Defensive back Quinn Buckner went on to a career in the National Basketball Association.

References

Indiana
Indiana Hoosiers football seasons
Indiana Hoosiers football